Smack This! is the second video by American rock band Godsmack, released in April 2002. It was filmed over a period of five years, during which Godsmack released two albums and went on ten different live tours. The film is a compilation of candid interviews, backstage antics, and live footage from the band's tours.

Song track listing
 "Whatever"   
 "Immune"  
 "Voodoo"   
 "Get Up, Get Out!"  
 "Time Bomb"   
 "Walk" (with Pantera)  
 "Keep Away" 
 "Stress" 
 "Moon Baby"

Personnel
 Sully Erna – vocals, rhythm guitar, additional drums
 Tony Rombola – lead guitar, additional vocals
 Robbie Merrill – bass, additional vocals
 Tommy Stewart – drums

Godsmack video albums
2001 live albums
2001 video albums
Live video albums